Maurício do Valle (1 March 1928 – 7 October 1994) was a Brazilian film actor. He appeared in 70 films between 1952 and 1994. He is also known for his roles in several Brazilian TV series, such as Rede Globo's Roque Santeiro (1985), and even for his role of secondary actor in the series Os Trapalhões, as well as in some films of this group.

Selected filmography

 Tudo Azul (1952) - (uncredited)
 Na Senda do Crime (1954) - (uncredited)
 Além do Rios das Mortes (1958)
 Briga, Mulher e Samba (1960) - Zé
 O Homem Que Roubou a Copa do Mundo (1961)
 Terra Sem Deus (1963)
 Boca de Ouro (1963)
 Black God, White Devil (1964) - Antônio das Mortes
 Selva Trágica (1964) - Isaac
 História de um Crápula (1965)
 Grande Sertão (1965) - Riobaldo
 The Hour and Turn of Augusto Matraga (1965) - Priest
 Riacho do Sangue (1966) - Floro Pereira
 Terra em Transe (1967) - Security guard
 Cangaceiros de Lampião (1967) - Carcara
 O Jeca e a Freira (1968) - Seu Pedro
 Bebel, Garota Propaganda (1968) - Renatão
 O Dragão da Maldade Contra o Santo Guerreiro (1969) - Antonio das Mortes, the Jagunço / Killer
 Sete Homens Vivos ou Mortos (1969)
 O Cangaceiro Sem Deus (1969)
 O Cangaceiro Sanguinário (1969) - Capitão / Captain Jagunço
 Corisco, O Diabo Loiro (1969) - Corisco
 The Prophet of Hunger (1970) - Lion Tamer
 Pindorama (1970) - D. Sebastião de Souza
 A Vingança Dos Doze (1970) - Carlão
 Audácia (1970)
 As Gatinhas (1970) - Man with Beard
 O Marginal (1974) - Sapo
 A Cartomante (1974)
 Pecado na Sacristia (1975) - Ferrolho Feitosa
 O Roubo das Calcinhas (1975) - Manuel - Segment 2 - Filó s husband
 O Dia em Que o Santo Pecou (1975) - João Baleia
 Kung Fu Contra as Bonecas (1975)
 Bacalhau (1975) - Quico
 Crueldade Mortal (1976) - Tranca Rua
 Soledade, a Bagaceira (1976)
 Chão Bruto (1976) - Paulo
 As Meninas Querem... Os Coroas Podem (1976)
 O Jogo da Vida (1977)
 Anchieta, José do Brasil (1977)
 Os Cangaceiros do Vale da Morte (1978)
 O Cortiço (1978)
 Sábado Alucinante (1979) - Ivan
 O Coronel e o Lobisomem (1979)
 O Cinderelo Trapalhão (1979)
 O Caçador de Esmeraldas (1979) - Matias Cardoso
 Nos Tempos da Vaselina (1979)
 Mulheres do Cais (1979)
 Os Sete Gatinhos (1980) - Congressman
 Parceiros da Aventura (1980) - Soares
 A Idade da Terra (1980) - Brahms
 As Intimidades de Analu e Fernanda (1980)
 Rio Babilônia (1982)
 Curral de Mulheres (1982) - Edgar
 Profissão Mulher (1983) - Sérgio
 Gabriela, Cravo e Canela (1983) - Cel. Amâncio Leal
 Águia na Cabeça (1984)
 Quilombo (1984) - Dominingos Jorge Velho
 Os Trapalhões e o Mágico de Oróz (1984) - Colonel Fereira
 Os Trapalhões no Reino da Fantasia (1985)
 Chico Rei (1985) - Merchant
 Os Trapalhões e o Rei do futebol (1986) - Edésio
 Rastros na Areia (1988)
 Natal da Portela (1988)
 Better Days Ahead (1989) - Dono da Buchada
 O Grande Mentecapto (1989)
 Assim na Tela Como no Céu (1989)

References

External links

1928 births
1994 deaths
Brazilian male film actors
Brazilian male comedians
Os Trapalhões
Male actors from Rio de Janeiro (city)
20th-century Brazilian male actors
20th-century comedians